The BETAB-500 or the BETAB-500 Concrete-Piercing Bomb is a Soviet and Russian  bomb designed to penetrate and destroy reinforced concrete structures and to damage runways. During the Syrian civil war, the Russian military has used it repeatedly. In 2016, apparently the first use of this bomb in an urban environment occurred in the Eastern part of the city of Aleppo.

Specifications
Main characteristics
 Diameter: 
 Length: 
Weight
 bomb: 
 explosive (TNT equivalent ): 
Operational envelope
 release altitude: 
 release speed:

References

External links 
 BETAB 500 at Global Security
 

Aerial bombs of Russia
Cold War aerial bombs of the Soviet Union